Benetutti is a comune (municipality) in the Province of Sassari in the Italian region Sardinia, located about  north of Cagliari and about  southeast of Sassari.

Several prehistorical archaeological remains have been discovered in its countryside. These include Giants' tombs (Bronze Age mass graves), Domus de Janas (hypogaean Neolithic graves) and several nuraghi. An example of Roman ruins is the bath-pool on Saint Saturnino's hot springs. Benetutti is  known for its thermal sources, famous since ancient times and probably related to the name of the village, which could come from the Sardinian bena 'e tottu, meaning "everyone's fountain".

Inhabitants of the village include Francesco Cocco Ortu, who was a minister of the Kingdom of Italy.

In the main church hangs a 1549 painting by the "Maestro di Ozieri", Giovanni del Giglio, and assistants.

Benetutti borders the following municipalities: Bono, Bultei, Nule, Nuoro, Oniferi, Orani, Orune, and Pattada.

References

External links

Official website
Site about Benetutti
Benetutti.Net Photos, Little movies, songs and discussions among the inhabitants
Benetutti on "Comunas"
Benetutti on the Mountain Community of Goceano
Anagraphic office online
Benetutti on the website of "Comuni-Italiani"

Cities and towns in Sardinia
Spa towns in Italy